Jul i andlighetens rum was released on 7 November 2014, and is a Sonja Aldén Christmas album.

Track listing
Jul, jul, strålande jul
Bereden väg för Herran (with Åsa Jinder)
Gläns över sjö och strand
En stjärna lyser så klar (En stjerne skinner i natt)
Snön
Viskar en bön
Stilla natt (Stille Nacht, helige Nacht)
Koppången
O helga natt (Cantique de Noël)
När det lider mot jul (with Åsa Jinder)
Den första julen
Ave Maria

Charts

References

Sonja Aldén albums
2014 Christmas albums
Christmas albums by Swedish artists
Schlager Christmas albums